In geometry, a mixtilinear incircle of a triangle is a circle tangent to two of its sides and internally tangent to its circumcircle. The mixtilinear incircle of a triangle tangent to the two sides containing vertex  is called the -mixtilinear incircle. Every triangle has three unique mixtilinear incircles, one corresponding to each vertex.

Proof of existence and uniqueness 

The -excircle of triangle  is unique. Since inversion and reflection are bijective and preserve touching points, then  does as well.

Construction 
The -mixtilinear incircle can be constructed with the following sequence of steps. 
 Draw the incenter  by intersecting angle bisectors.
These are the tangent points of the mixtilinear circle.

This construction is possible because of the following fact:

Lemma 
The incenter is the midpoint of the touching points of the mixtilinear incircle with the two sides.

Proof 
Pascal's theorem on hexagon  inscribed in  implies that  are collinear.

Other properties

Radius 
The following formula relates the radius  of the incircle and the radius  of the -mixtilinear incircle of a triangle :

Relationship with points on the circumcircle 

 The midpoint of the arc  that contains point  is on the line .
 The quadrilateral  is harmonic, which means that  is a symmedian on triangle .

Circles related to the tangency point with the circumcircle 

Spiral similarities 

 is the center of a spiral similarity that maps  to  respectively.

Relationship between the three mixtilinear incircles

Lines joining vertices and mixtilinear tangency points 
The three lines joining a vertex to the point of contact of the circumcircle with the corresponding mixtilinear incircle meet at the external center of similitude of the incircle and circumcircle. The Online Encyclopedia of Triangle Centers lists this point as X(56). It is defined by trilinear coordinates  and barycentric coordinates  .

Radical center 
The radical center of the three mixtilinear incircles is the point  which divides  in the ratio where  are the incenter, inradius, circumcenter and circumradius respectively.

References 

Euclidean plane geometry